Chemmanthatta  is a village in Thrissur district in the state of Kerala, India.

Demographics
 India census, Chemmanthatta had a population of 5323 with 2511 males and 2812 females.

References

Villages in Thrissur district